Capulus is a genus of small sea snails, marine gastropod mollusks in the family Capulidae, the cap snails.

Species
Species within the genus Capulus include:
 Capulus badius Dunker, 1882
 Capulus californicus Dall, 1900
 Capulus compressus E. A. Smith, 1891
 Capulus danieli (Crosse, 1858)
 † Capulus deurganckensis Marquet & Landau, 2006 
 Capulus devexus (May, 1916)
 Capulus dilatatus A. Adams, 1860
 Capulus elegans (Tapparone Canefri, 1877)
 Capulus fragilis E. A. Smith, 1904
 Capulus huangi S.-I Huang & Y.-F. Huang, 2012
 Capulus japonicus A. Adams, 1861
 Capulus kawamurai Habe, 1992
 Capulus ngai Thach, 2016
 Capulus novaezelandiae Dell, 1978
 Capulus otohimeae (Habe, 1946)
 † Capulus partimsinuosus (S. V. Wood, 1848) 
 Capulus sericeus J. Burch & R. Burch, 1961
 Capulus simplex Locard, 1898
 † Capulus sinuosus (Brocchi, 1814) 
 Capulus spondylicola Habe, 1967
 Capulus subcompressus Pelseneer, 1903
 Capulus ungaricoides (d'Orbigny, 1841)
 Capulus ungaricus (Linnaeus, 1758)
 Capulus violaceus Angas, 1867

Species brought into synonymy
 Capulus bicarinatus (Pease, 1861a): synonym of Amathina bicarinata Pease, 1861
 Capulus chilensis Dall, 1904: synonym of Capulus ungaricoides (d'Orbigny, 1841)
 † Capulus corrugatus (extinct/fossil): synonym of † Capulus partimsinuosus (S. V. Wood, 1848) 
 Capulus devotus Hedley, 1904: synonym of Malluvium devotum (Hedley, 1904) (original combination)
 Capulus galea Dall, 1889: synonym of Hyalorisia galea (Dall, 1889)
 Capulus galeus [sic]: synonym of Capulus galea Dall, 1889: synonym of Hyalorisia galea (Dall, 1889)
 Capulus hungaricus [sic]: synonym of Capulus ungaricus (Linnaeus, 1758)
 Capulus incurvus (Gmelin, 1791): synonym of Hipponix incurvus (Gmelin, 1791)
 Capulus intortus (Lamarck, 1822): synonym of Hipponix incurvus (Gmelin, 1791)
 Capulus kawamurai Habe, 1992: synonym of Capulus danieli (Crosse, 1858)
 Capulus liberatus Pease, 1868: synonym of Krebsia liberata (Pease, 1868)
 Capulus lissus E.A. Smith, 1894: synonym of Malluvium lissum (E. A. Smith, 1894)
 Capulus militaris (Linnaeus, 1771): synonym of Capulus ungaricus (Linnaeus, 1758)
 Capulus nutatus Hedley, 1908: synonym of Williamia radiata nutata (Hedley, 1908)
 Capulus radiatus M. Sars, 1851: synonym of Piliscus radiatus (Sars M., 1851): synonym of Piliscus commodus (Middendorff, 1851)
 Capulus sagittifer Gould, 1852: synonym of Phenacolepas sagittifer (Gould, 1852)
 Capulus shreevei Conrad, 1869: synonym of Cyrtopleura costata (Linnaeus, 1758)
 Capulus sycophanta Garrard, 1961: synonym of Capulus danieli (Crosse, 1858)
 Capulus uncinatus (Hutton, 1873): synonym of Capulus danieli (Crosse, 1858)

According to the Indo-Pacific Molluscan Database (OBIS) the following species names are also in current use 
 Capulus irregularis E. A. Smith, 1895
 Capulus paleacea Menke

References

 Gofas, S.; Le Renard, J.; Bouchet, P. (2001). Mollusca, in: Costello, M.J. et al. (Ed.) (2001). European register of marine species: a check-list of the marine species in Europe and a bibliography of guides to their identification. Collection Patrimoines Naturels, 50: pp. 180–213 
 Beu A.G. (2004) Marine Mollusca of oxygen isotope stages of the last 2 million years in New Zealand. Part 1: Revised generic positions and recognition of warm-water and cool-water migrants. Journal of the Royal Society of New Zealand 34(2): 111-265. page(s): 192
 Spencer, H.; Marshall. B. (2009). All Mollusca except Opisthobranchia. In: Gordon, D. (Ed.) (2009). New Zealand Inventory of Biodiversity. Volume One: Kingdom Animalia. 584 pp

External links
 Montfort P. [Denys de. (1808-1810). Conchyliologie systématique et classification méthodique des coquilles. Paris: Schoell. Vol. 1: pp. lxxxvii + 409 [1808]. Vol. 2: pp. 676 + 16]

Capulidae
Gastropod genera
Extant Silurian first appearances